The 1954 New Mexico Lobos football team represented the University of New Mexico in the Skyline Conference during the 1954 college football season.  In their second season under head coach Bob Titchenal, the Lobos compiled a 5–5 record (3–3 against Skyline opponents), finished in a tie for fourth place in the conference, and were outscored by their opponents by a total of 168 to 152. Quarterback Jerry Lott led the team on offense.

Schedule

References

New Mexico
New Mexico Lobos football seasons
New Mexico Lobos football